MERMEC S.p.A. is an Italian company focused on rail inspection and diagnostics (both systems and vehicles), railway signalling, asset management software, diagnostic and professional services for the railway industry.  Today, MERMEC is part of the MERMEC Group, an international holding company with more than 300 employees worldwide whose subsidiaries include UK based MERMEC UK, USA based MERMEC Inc., Italy based Tecnogamma S.p.A., France based MERMEC France, Australia based MERMEC Australia Pty Ltd and Japan based MER MEC JAPAN G.K.

History 
Prior to becoming a joint-stock company in 1988, MER MEC was known as Meridional Meccanica, which began in the 1960s.  Meridional Meccanica began making railway maintenance vehicles in the early 1980s and after incorporating focused all of its attention to the railway market.

In the early 1990s MER MEC, in cooperation with the main Italian research institutes, developed an opto-electronic system for the automatic inspection of railway infrastructure conditions.  The 1990s also saw the prototype of the ROGER vehicle which is an acronym for Rilievo Ottico Geometria Rotaia, Italian for optical rail geometry control.  In 1997 MER MEC produced the ROGER 1000, a self-propelled vehicle for rail track and overhead line inspection.

Today, MER MEC exports its products worldwide, in particular to Australia, Brazil, Chile, China, France, Greece, Norway, Peru, South Korea, Spain, Sweden, Switzerland, Syria, Taiwan, Turkey, USA, Japan.

Certifications 
MER MEC has been awarded the following certifications: UNI EN ISO 9001; UNI EN ISO 14001:2004; IRIS: 2006 (International Railway Industry Standards); SA8000: 2001

Memberships 
MER MEC is an authorized research laboratory of the Italian Ministry of university and Research and a member of the following organizations: UNIFE; CEN - the European Committee for Standardization.
Since 2010 MERMEC Group is part of the UNISIG Consortium

See also 

List of Italian companies

Notes

References 
 MERMEC Group website

Rail industry
Engineering companies of Italy
Technology companies established in 1960
Italian companies established in 1960
Italian brands